William Reynbald (by 1488 – 1556), of Ipswich, Suffolk, was an English politician.

He was a Member of Parliament (MP) for Ipswich in 1545.

References

15th-century births
1556 deaths
Members of the Parliament of England (pre-1707) for Ipswich
English MPs 1545–1547